Walter Kaitna (4 November 1914 – October 1983) was an Austrian field hockey player. He competed in the men's tournament at the 1952 Summer Olympics.

References

External links
 

1914 births
1983 deaths
Austrian male field hockey players
Olympic field hockey players of Austria
Field hockey players at the 1952 Summer Olympics
Field hockey players from Vienna